Peter Georg Bang (7 October 1797 – 2 April 1861) was a Danish politician and jurist. He served as the Prime Minister of Denmark 1854–1856.

Biography
Bang was born in Copenhagen, Denmark. His parents were Jacob Hansen Bang   (1770-1841) and Anna Cathrine Sophie Østrup (1779-1820).
He became a student at Frederiksborg Latin School in 1813, took lic.jur. in 1816 and obtained  Dr. Jur.  in 1820.
He was a professor of Roman law at the University of Copenhagen and from 1836 to 1845 he was director of Danmarks Nationalbank.
In 1845 when he was appointed Deputy in National Treasury (Rentekammeret).

His daughter, Ville Bang (1848–1932), became a recognized painter and art teacher.

Bang became Commander of the Order of the Dannebrog in  1847 and was awarded the Grand Cross in 1854. He died in 1861 and is buried in  Assistens Cemetery  in Copenhagen.

References

Other sources
Alastair H. Thomas (2016) Historical Dictionary of Denmark (Rowman & Littlefield) 

1797 births
1861 deaths
University of Copenhagen alumni
Politicians from Copenhagen
Governors of the Bank of Denmark
Danish Interior Ministers
Danish Kultus Ministers
Prime Ministers of Denmark
Members of the Folketing
19th-century Danish politicians
Commanders of the Order of the Dannebrog
Burials at Assistens Cemetery (Copenhagen)